Cychrus lajinensis is a species of ground beetle in the subfamily of Carabinae. It was described by Deuve & Tian in 2002.

References

lajinensis
Beetles described in 2002